José Moreira Bastos Neto (January 25, 1953 – April 26, 2014) was a Brazilian Roman Catholic bishop.

Ordained to the priesthood in 1979, Bastos Neto was appointed bishop of the Roman Catholic Diocese of Três Lagoas, Mato Grosso do Sul, in 2009. He died while still in office.

See also
Roman Catholic Diocese of Três Lagoas

Notes

1953 births
2014 deaths
21st-century Roman Catholic bishops in Brazil
Roman Catholic bishops of Três Lagoas